William "Butch" Hays (born 16 September 1962) is an American-Australian former professional basketball player who played most of his career in Australia's National Basketball League (NBL) from 1991 to 2003.

Early life
Born in Los Angeles, Hays grew up in South Central L.A. on West 75th Street in an area known for its street gangs and where he was located was directly between two of the gangs, the Bloods and Crips. As a youth he played athletics, American football and baseball, but was introduced to basketball by a neighbour when he was 12 years old, but it wasn't until he was in high school that he started receiving some coaching.

Until high school, Hays and his friends would play street pick up games.

School / college career
Butch Hays earned All-American honours while at St. Bernard High School and was awarded a scholarship with the University of California, Berkeley. After four years with the Golden Bears under the coaching of Dick Kuchen, Hays graduated as the Golden Bears' all-time leader in assists, though this record has since fallen to former teammate Kevin Johnson and, later, Jason Kidd.

Professional career

1984 NBA Draft
After graduating from Cal Berkeley, Hays, a  point guard, nominated for the 1984 NBA draft and was a seventh round pick of the Chicago Bulls who that year also drafted a player from North Carolina named Michael Jordan. As draftees, Hays and Jordan roomed together and actually lived together before Hays was released from his contract.

CBA
Hays landed in the Continental Basketball Association where in 1988 he signed with new team, the San Jose Jammers.

NBL
After two years with the Jammers, Hays was then signed for two years as an import player by the Adelaide 36ers in Australia's National Basketball League as the teams replacement for long time point guard Al Green. Hays had an immediate impact with the 36ers in 1991 who in 1990 had missed the NBL playoffs for the first time since 1983. Showing his class and skill, Hays averaged 24.6 points, 4.5 rebounds and 9 assists as he helped the 36ers back to the playoffs where they would ultimately be beaten 2–0 in the Semi-finals by their nemesis, the defending and eventual champion Perth Wildcats. In his first NBL game for the 36ers against the Illawarra Hawks on 12 April at Adelaide's then home court, the 3,000 seat Apollo Stadium, Hays scored 36 points which as of 2020–21 remains the 36ers club record for points scored in a debut game. In that game he also had 8 rebounds, 11 assists and 6 steals making him an instant favourite among the 36ers fans. During his first year with the 36ers, Hays also set the still standing club record for assists in a single game in the second of the Quarter finals against the Melbourne Tigers, dishing out 17 to help Adelaide to a 132–96 win.

1992 saw the 36ers move into the 8,000-seat Clipsal Powerhouse, but also saw Hays' numbers dip slightly to 21.6 points, 4.6 rebounds and 6.6 assists and the 36ers missed the NBL playoffs. At the end of the year, the 36ers signed veteran Australian Boomers point guard and local Adelaide product Phil Smyth. This, combined with the continued development of local guard Brett Maher, saw the then-30-year-old Hays unwanted by the club and he signed with another NBL team, the perennially struggling Illawarra Hawks for two years.

Hays helped the Hawks to the quarter-finals in 1993 and 1994 before signing with his 3rd NBL team, the Newcastle Falcons from 1995. He would spend 3 seasons in Newcastle, helping the Falcons to the playoffs in 1995, but missing the finals in 1996 and 1997.

In 1998, Hays signed to play for the North Melbourne Giants, though his stint with his 4th NBL club only lasted 8 games before leaving the club. Unfortunately, due to the NBL's rules at the time he was unable to sign with another club and was forced to sit out the remainder of the season. He then returned to the Falcons for 1998–99 NBL season before retiring at the end of the year. He then began to play with the Maitland Mustangs in the New South Wales-based Waratah League.

During the 2002–03 NBL season, Hays suited up for four games for the NBL's Canberra Cannons before retiring (for the final time) from the NBL at the age of 41. He then returned to the Mustangs where he would play until calling time on his career at the age of 50 in 2012.

Butch Hays played 232 NBL games, averaging 18.6 points, 4.5 rebounds and 6.0 assists per game.

Honours and Accolades
Butch Hays finished his college basketball career in 1984 as the California Golden Bears all-time assists leader.

In 2015, former Adelaide 36ers teammate and NBL legend Mark Davis called Hays one of the smartest point guards he played with in his 17-year professional career.

During his career, Hays was known for his knee-high socks.

Current
Butch Hays currently lives in Newcastle, Australia with his wife Julia. The couple have two children; daughter Roberta born in 1989 and son Griffin born in 1992. On 6 May 2010, Hays' 18-year-old son Griffin was killed in an accident on a Newcastle rail line.

Butch continues to play basketball in the Newcastle Premier League for local team the Hustlers, playing with fellow imports Terrell Turner and Waratah League MVP  Mitch Rueter along with other ex-Waratah League, Newcastle Hunters and representative players.

He is now the CEO at SNAP Programs, which is a non-for-profit organisation that assists other organisations and families, in supporting both, young people and people with a disability, through a variety of different programs.

NBL career stats

|-
| style="text-align:left"| 1991
| style="text-align:left;"| Adelaide 36ers
| 30 || 30 || 42.4 || .542 || .551 || .821 || 4.5 || 9.0 || 2.0 || 0.3 || 24.6
|-
| style="text-align:left"| 1992
| style="text-align:left;"| Adelaide 36ers
| 24 || 24 || 41.4 || .506 || .419 || .773 || 4.6 || 6.6 || 2.2 || 0.5 || 21.6
|-
| style="text-align:left"| 1993
| style="text-align:left;"| Illawarra Hawks
| 28 || 28 || 45.6 || .483 || .309 || .774 || 4.5 || 6.2 || 2.3 || 0.0 || 18.3
|-
| style="text-align:left"| 1994
| style="text-align:left;"| Illawarra Hawks
| 28 || 28 || 45.6 || .519 || .456 || .770 || 5.3 || 5.4 || 2.1 || 0.2 || 21.0
|-
| style="text-align:left"| 1995
| style="text-align:left;"| Newcastle Falcons
| 29 || 29 || 44.7 || .472 || .422 || .778 || 5.6 || 7.1 || 1.5 || 0.5 || 20.2
|-
| style="text-align:left"| 1996
| style="text-align:left;"| Newcastle Falcons
| 26 || 26 || 45.1 || .456 || .381 || .839 || 5.5 || 6.0 || 1.3 || 0.6 || 18.7
|-
| style="text-align:left"| 1997
| style="text-align:left;"| Newcastle Falcons
| 30 || 30 || 42.9 || .473 || .366 || .781 || 4.2 || 5.1 || 1.4 || 0.1 || 17.8
|-
| style="text-align:left"| 1998
| style="text-align:left;"| North Melbourne Giants
| 8 || 8 || 37.1 || .466 || .286 || .688 || 2.9 || 3.4 || 0.9 || 0.1 || 8.9
|-
| style="text-align:left"| 1998–99
| style="text-align:left;"| Newcastle Falcons
| 25 || 25 || 28.8 || .459 || .337 || .758 || 2.3 || 3.3 || 0.7 || 0.2 || 10.8
|-
| style="text-align:left"| 2002–03
| style="text-align:left;"| Canberra Cannons
| 4 || 0 || 11.4 || .250 || .200 || .600 || 1.0 || 1.8 || 0.8 || 0.0 || 2.0
|- class="sortbottom"
| style="text-align:center;" colspan="2" | Career
| 232 || 228 || 41.6 || .491 || .392 || .790 || 4.5 || 6.0 || 1.6 || 0.3 || 18.6
|}

References

External links
 butchhays.com
 Adelaide 36ers - TITLE TOWN (1990s)

1962 births
Living people
20th-century African-American sportspeople
21st-century African-American people
Adelaide 36ers players
African-American basketball players
American expatriate basketball people in the Philippines
American men's basketball players
Basketball players from Los Angeles
California Golden Bears men's basketball players
Canberra Cannons players
Chicago Bulls draft picks
Illawarra Hawks players
Manila Beer Brewmasters players
Newcastle Falcons (basketball) players
North Melbourne Giants players
Philippine Basketball Association imports
Point guards
San Jose Jammers players